Debra Rae Anderson (June 13, 1949 – November 10, 2022) was an American politician.

Anderson was born in Bryant, Hamlin County, South Dakota, and graduated from Bryant High School in 1967. She then graduated from Augustana University in Sioux Falls, South Dakota, in 1971. Anderson served in the South Dakota House of Representatives from 1977 until her resignation in 1989; served as speaker of the South Dakota House of Representatives from 1987 until 1988. She was a Republican, Anderson then served during the administration of President George H.W. Bush. She died at her home in Washington, D.C. on November 10, 2022, at the age of 73.

References

1949 births
2022 deaths
People from Hamlin County, South Dakota
Augustana University alumni
Women state legislators in South Dakota
Speakers of the South Dakota House of Representatives
Republican Party members of the South Dakota House of Representatives
George H. W. Bush administration personnel